Peoria calamistis is a moth in the family Crambidae. It was described by George Hampson in 1917. It is found in Colombia.

The wingspan is about 28 mm. The forewings are ochreous, irrorated (sprinkled) with black brown. There is a black antemedial mark and a terminal series of points. The hindwings are ochreous with a brownish termen.

References

Moths described in 1917
Anerastiini
Taxa named by George Hampson